Norman Wright (27 December 1908 – 30 January 1974) was an English professional footballer who played as a winger.

References

1908 births
1974 deaths
Footballers from County Durham
English footballers
Association football wingers
Esh Winning F.C. players
Grimsby Town F.C. players
Crewe Alexandra F.C. players
Accrington Stanley F.C. (1891) players
Manchester City F.C. players
Watford F.C. players
South Shields F.C. (1936) players
English Football League players
People from Ushaw Moor